Diathera is a genus of moths in the family Geometridae.

Species
 Diathera brunneata Choi, 1999
 Diathera fluctuata Choi, 1999
 Diathera metacolorata Choi, 1999

References
 Diathera at Markku Savela's Lepidoptera and Some Other Life Forms
 Natural History Museum Lepidoptera genus database

Cidariini
Geometridae genera